is a mountain located on Uotsuri-jima of Senkaku Islands in Ishigaki, Okinawa, Japan. It is the second highest point of the island, after Mount Narahara.

See also
 Mount Byōbu

Mountains of Okinawa Prefecture
Senkaku Islands